Carlos Eduardo Schneider known as Duda (nickname of Eduardo; born 22 September 1988) is a Brazilian footballer.

Biography
Duda started his career at Internacional. He signed a 1-year professional contract in 2006. However, he did not made a debut for Inter. In 2009, he left for Giulianova of Italian Lega Pro Prima Divisione, as he has a reported Italian passport, which not blocked by FIGC non-EU policy. (Despite Schneider is a German surname) He only made handful starts in 2009–10 season.

In 2011, he was released by Giulianova.

References

External links
 
 Football.it Profile 

Brazilian footballers
Sport Club Internacional players
Giulianova Calcio players
Association football forwards
Brazilian expatriate footballers
Expatriate footballers in Italy
Brazilian expatriate sportspeople in Italy
1988 births
Living people